Thor Hushovd (born 18 January 1978) is a Norwegian former professional road bicycle racer. He is known for sprinting and time trialing; Hushovd is a three-time Norwegian national road race champion (2004, 2010, 2013), and was the winner of the 2010 World Road Race Championships. He was the first Norwegian to lead the Tour de France, and first Scandinavian to win the road race in cycling world road championship. He is also the Scandinavian with the most stage wins in Grand Tours. He is widely considered the greatest Norwegian cyclist of all time. He retired in September 2014.

Career
Born in Grimstad, Aust-Agder, Norway, Thor won the under-23 time trial world championship and the under-23 versions of Paris–Roubaix and Paris–Tours before turning professional in 1998. He was Norwegian time trial champion in 2004 and 2005 and road race champion in 2004 and 2010. In 2006, he won seven UCI ProTour races and two stages of the Tour de France. He won the prologue in Strasbourg and led after the first day despite a cut arm. He continued with stitches and regained the yellow jersey after stage 2 with a third place. He won the last stage, beating Robbie McEwen in a sprint, thus making him the only person to win the first stage or prologue and the last stage of the Tour de France in the same year. In the 2006 Vuelta a España he won stage 6, wore the golden jersey for three stages and won the points classification

At the 2008 Tour de France, Hushovd won stage 2 in a bunch finish.

2009

He took one of the team's first victories of the season by winning Stage 3 of the Tour of California. At the Tour de France, he won green jersey for the points classification for the second time, ahead of Mark Cavendish. Typically the sprinter with the most stage victories wins the points classification, though Thor only won one stage, stage 6, while Cavendish won six. After a controversy on stage 14, where Cavendish was relegated to the back of the peloton for impeding Hushovd, Hushovd attacked alone on stage 17, a mountain stage, winning two intermediate sprints. Hushovd won stage 3 at the Tour of Missouri –  over rolling hills – in September 2009, in a sprint finish.

2010

On 9 May 2010, Hushovd broke his collarbone on a training ride after colliding with a young girl. At the Tour de France, Hushovd won the third stage, which was an unusual one for the Tour since it featured  of cobblestones. He prevailed in the sprint involving five other riders. That victory netted him the Green jersey, but he ultimately lost it to Alessandro Petacchi of the  team.

On 3 October 2010, Thor won the road world championship, which started in Melbourne and finished in Geelong, Australia. He was the first Norwegian to win the rainbow jersey. VeloNews said: "Hushovd...dominated a bunch sprint at the end of a thrilling 267 km race, beating Denmark's Matti Breschel and Australia's Allan Davis." The favorite, Philippe Gilbert, was caught with three kilometers to go.

2011

During the 2011 Tour de France Hushovd took the lead in the general classification and surprised many by keeping it through several hilly stages that were not expected to suit him and second placed Cadel Evans could not over turn the 1 second advantage that Hushovd held. Thor surprised his fans again on stage 13 by being one of the first riders over the hors catégorie Col d'Aubisque and using his superior descending skills (he was clocked at 69 mph at one point) to catch and pass the leaders David Moncoutié and Jérémy Roy to take the stage. He used his descending skills again on stage 16 when he, Edvald Boasson Hagen and teammate Ryder Hesjedal went clear on the descent of the Col de Manse (a descent that overall runner up Andy Schleck deemed too dangerous for the tour) and beat Boasson Hagen in the final sprint to take his second stage of the tour.

2012

In 2012, Hushovd joined  on a three-year contract. Suffering from a then unknown medical condition, he had to abandon the Giro d'Italia and cancelled his scheduled participation to the Tour de France and Olympic road race. The medical impairment was later identified as a "virus and muscle inflammation" by team doctors. Thor hardly achieved any notable result in the season except fourteenth at Paris–Roubaix. In October, he said that he hoped to put the bad year and the virus that ruined it behind him and that he was optimistic and motivated about the 2013 season.

2013

Retirement
In June 2014 Thor announced that he would retire after the 2014 UCI Road World Championships after struggling with Infectious mononucleosis since 2012. However, after a hard crash suffered at the Tour du Poitou-Charentes, Hushovd said he would not participate in the World Championships. His last race was the GP Impanis-Van Petegem in September.

2015 Thor announced that he had started working on organizing an all-Norwegian UCI WorldTeam, with a plan to launch in the 2017 season to coincide with the hosting of the 2017 UCI Road World Championships in the Norwegian city of Bergen.

Personal life
Thor currently resides in Monte Carlo, Monaco, with his wife Susanne, and their daughter Isabel (b. 2009). The Hushovds also maintain an offseason residency in Grimstad, Aust-Agder, Norway.

Career achievements

Major results

1995
 1st  Time trial, National Junior Road Championships
1996
 National Junior Road Championships
1st  Road race
1st  Time trial
1998
 UCI Road World Under-23 Championships
1st  Time trial 
5th Road race
 1st Paris–Roubaix Espoirs
 1st Paris–Tours Espoirs
 5th Overall Tour of Sweden
1999
 1st  Overall Ringerike GP
1st Stages 2, 4 & 5 
 1st Tour du Loir-et-Cher
 1st Stage 5 Tour of Sweden
 6th Time trial, UCI Road World Under-23 Championships
 6th Overall Ronde de l'Isard
2000
 1st Stage 1 Tour de Picardie
 1st Prologue Tour de l'Ain
 2nd Overall Ringerike GP
1st Stages 3, 4 & 5 
 2nd Grand Prix de Denain
 4th Overall Bayern Rundfahrt
 4th Giro della Provincia di Siracusa
 5th HEW Cyclassics
 6th Time trial, Olympic Games
2001
 1st  Overall Tour de Normandie
1st  Points classification
1st Prologue, Stages 1 & 4 
 1st  Overall Tour of Sweden
1st Stages 1a (ITT) & 3 
 1st  Overall Paris–Corrèze
 1st Stage 5 (TTT) Tour de France
 4th Paris–Tours
 9th Grand Prix de Villers-Cotterêts
2002
 National Road Championships
1st  Time trial
3rd Road race
 1st Stage 18 Tour de France
 1st Stage 2 Tour de l'Ain
 5th Overall Étoile de Bessèges
 6th Overall Tour du Poitou Charentes et de la Vienne
 8th Grand Prix Eddy Merckx (with Anthony Morin)
2003
 1st Grote Prijs Jef Scherens
 1st Stage 2 Critérium du Dauphiné Libéré
 1st Stage 1 Vuelta a Castilla y León
 3rd Overall Tour du Limousin
 5th Overall Tour Méditerranéen
 7th Overall Tour du Poitou Charentes et de la Vienne
 10th GP Ouest–France
2004
 National Road Championships
1st  Road race
1st  Time trial
 1st Overall French Road Cycling Cup
 1st Grand Prix de Denain
 1st Classic Haribo
 1st Tour de Vendée
 1st Stage 8 Tour de France
 1st Stage 1 Critérium du Dauphiné Libéré
 Tour du Languedoc-Roussillon
1st  Points classification
1st Stages 1 & 2 
 3rd Grand Prix de Cholet – Pays de Loire
 3rd Grand Prix de Fourmies
 5th Overall Critérium International
 7th Ronde van Midden-Zeeland
 8th Grand Prix de Villers-Cotterêts
 8th Grand Prix de Plumelec-Morbihan
 9th Overall Étoile de Bessèges
1st Stage 3 
2005
 1st  Time trial, National Road Championships
 Volta a Catalunya
1st  Points classification
1st Stage 7
 1st Stage 5 Vuelta a España
 1st Stage 2 Critérium du Dauphiné Libéré
 1st Stage 4 Tour du Limousin
 1st  Points classification, Tour de France
 3rd Milan–San Remo
 5th Gent–Wevelgem
 6th Overall Four Days of Dunkirk
1st Stage 1 
 9th Paris–Roubaix
2006
 1st Gent–Wevelgem
 Tour de France
1st Prologue & Stage 20
Held  after Stages 1 & 3
 Vuelta a España
1st  Points classification
1st Stage 6
Held  after Stages 2–4
 Volta a Catalunya
1st  Points classification
1st Stage 3
 1st Stage 7 Critérium du Dauphiné Libéré
 1st Stage 4 Tirreno–Adriatico
 1st  Points classification, Four Days of Dunkirk
 2nd Classic Haribo
 4th Paris–Tours
2007
 1st Stage 4 Tour de France
 1st Stage 7 Giro d'Italia
 2nd Road race, National Road Championships
 2nd GP Ouest–France
 3rd Grand Prix de Wallonie
 4th Paris–Bourges
 5th Grand Prix d'Isbergues
 8th Paris–Tours
 8th Paris–Brussels
2008
 1st Stage 2 Tour de France
 1st Stage 1 Tour Méditerranéen
 1st Stage 6 Four Days of Dunkirk
 Volta a Catalunya
1st  Points classification
1st Prologue & Stage 1
 Paris–Nice
1st  Points classification
1st Prologue
 3rd Omloop Het Volk
 9th Milan–San Remo
2009
 1st Omloop Het Nieuwsblad
 Tour de France
1st  Points classification
1st Stage 6
 Combativity award Stage 17 
 Volta a Catalunya
1st Stages 1 & 6
 Tour of Missouri
1st  Points classification
1st Stage 3
 1st Stage 3 Tour of California
 1st Stage 4 Tour du Poitou Charentes et de la Vienne
 3rd Road race, National Road Championships
 3rd Paris–Roubaix
 3rd Milan–San Remo
 4th E3 Prijs Vlaanderen
 5th Grand Prix of Aargau Canton
2010
 1st  Road race, UCI Road World Championships
 1st  Road race, National Road Championships
 1st Stage 3 Tour de France
 1st Stage 6 Vuelta a España
 2nd Paris–Roubaix
 6th Milan–San Remo
 6th Kuurne–Brussels–Kuurne
2011
 Tour de France
1st Stages 2 (TTT), 13 & 16
Held  from Stage 2–9
 1st Stage 4 Tour de Suisse
 1st Stage 4 Tour of Britain
 3rd Road race, National Road Championships
 4th GP Ouest–France
 8th Paris–Roubaix
2013
 National Road Championships
1st  Road race
2nd Time trial
 1st  Overall Arctic Race of Norway
1st  Points classification
1st Stages 2 & 4
 Tour de Pologne
1st Stages 3 & 5
 1st Stage 3 Tour of Austria
 1st Stage 1 Tour of Beijing
 4th Grand Prix d'Isbergues
 5th Overall Tour du Haut Var
1st Stage 1
 6th GP Ouest–France
 8th Vattenfall Cyclassics
2014
 9th Gent–Wevelgem

Grand Tour general classification results timeline

Classics results timeline

References

External links

 
 
 

1978 births
Living people
Norwegian male cyclists
Norwegian expatriates in Monaco
Norwegian Tour de France stage winners
Tour de France prologue winners
Tour de France Champs Elysées stage winners
Olympic cyclists of Norway
Cyclists at the 2000 Summer Olympics
Cyclists at the 2004 Summer Olympics
Norwegian Vuelta a España stage winners
People from Grimstad
Norwegian Giro d'Italia stage winners
UCI Road World Champions (elite men)
Tour de Suisse stage winners
2011 Tour de France stage winners
2010 Tour de France stage winners
People from Monte Carlo
Sportspeople from Agder